The 1999 Marlboro Grand Prix of Miami was the first and opening round of the 1999 CART FedEx Champ Car World Series season, held March 21, 1999, on the Homestead-Miami Speedway in Homestead, Florida.

Report

Report 
The race was less than a lap old when Naoki Hattori and Al Unser Jr. crashed in turns 1 and 2, collecting Raul Boesel. Boesel was substituting for Paul Tracy, who was suspended for the race due to multiple rough-driving incidents during the 1998 season. Boesel was unhurt, but Unser and Hattori both suffered leg injuries. Richie Hearn dropped out of the race due to suspension problems. In an interview with ABC pit reporter Gary Gerould, Hearn noted he and the team had been having problems with the car all weekend, deciding to retire as to not impede other drivers.

Scott Pruett crashed in turns one and two to bring out the second yellow flag on lap 81. He was trying to pass Mauricio Gugelmin for 16th place, but lost control and spun into the wall, though he was unhurt in the crash. Several drivers took advantage of the caution to make pit stops. Helio Castro-Neves inherited the lead when they did not pit under caution. Patrick Carpentier and Robby Gordon served drive-through penalties for not using the access road to properly enter the pits during the caution. For Gordon, it was insult added to injury, since he dealt with mechanical problems during the race, already several laps down. He later retired from the race after the third caution.

The third caution came out on lap 111, when Adrian Fernandez crashed in turn four. Despite a strong start and race, Fernandez's engine blew, and he slid into the turn four wall. Castroneves pitted from the lead, ceding the lead back to Moore.

Greg Moore won the opening race of the season from pole, leading 96 out of the 150 laps, winning comfortably ahead of Michael Andretti and Dario Franchitti before a crowd of roughly 40,000. Moore capitalized on a mistake Andretti made in the pits. Andretti had won the race the previous two years, but accidentally shut off his engine during his pit stop under the 2nd caution. It would turn out to be Moore's final pole and win.

Shigeaki Hattori crashed during practice on Friday, the impact measured at 140 Gs. Although he was removed from the car by track personnel, he only suffered a concussion and, despite withdrawing from the race, was at the track during the race on Sunday. This was the first Champ Car race since the 1993 Indianapolis 500 without 3-time champion Bobby Rahal, who retired after the 1998 season.

Classification

Qualifying

Race

Caution flags

Lap Leaders

Point standings after race

References 

Marlboro Grand Prix of Miami
Homestead–Miami Indy 300
Marlboro Grand Prix of Miami